Parkers Prairie is a city in Otter Tail County, Minnesota, United States. The population was 1,020 at the 2020 census.

History
Parkers Prairie was platted in 1880, some ten years after its namesake Parkers Prairie Township. The city was incorporated in 1903.

Geography

Minnesota State Highway 29 and Otter Tail County Road 38 are two of the main routes in the community.

Demographics

2010 census
As of the census of 2010, there were 1,011 people, 428 households, and 248 families living in the city. The racial makeup of the city was 99.2% White, 0.4% African American, 0.1% Native American, 0.1% from other races, and 0.2% from two or more races. Hispanic or Latino of any race were 0.4% of the population.

There were 428 households, of which 28.3% had children under the age of 18 living with them, 44.9% were married couples living together, 9.6% had a female householder with no husband present, 3.5% had a male householder with no wife present, and 42.1% were non-families. 38.3% of all households were made up of individuals, and 23.9% had someone living alone who was 65 years of age or older. The average household size was 2.20 and the average family size was 2.90.

The median age in the city was 46.6 years. 24% of residents were under the age of 18; 5.7% were between the ages of 18 and 24; 18.7% were from 25 to 44; 21% were from 45 to 64; and 30.3% were 65 years of age or older. The gender makeup of the city was 45.7% male and 54.3% female.

2000 census
As of the census of 2000, there were 991 people, 401 households, and 240 families living in the town. The racial makeup of the town was 99.39% White, 0.10% Asian, 0.10% from other races, and 0.40% from two or more races. Hispanic or Latino of any race were 0.61% of the population.

There were 401 households, out of which 25.4% had children under the age of 18 living with them, 50.6% were married couples living together, 7.5% had a female householder with no husband present, and 40.1% were non-families. 34.7% of all households were made up of individuals, and 23.2% had someone living alone who was 65 years of age or older.  The average household size was 2.22 and the average family size was 2.88.

In the town the population was spread out, with 20.8% under the age of 18, 6.0% from 18 to 24, 22.9% from 25 to 44, 20.7% from 45 to 64, and 29.7% who were 65 years of age or older.  The median age was 45 years. For every 100 females, there were 90.9 males.  For every 100 females age 18 and over, there were 85.1 males.

The median income for a household in the town was $28,618, and the median income for a family was $36,042. Males had a median income of $28,068 versus $19,250 for females. The per capita income for the town was $16,748.  About 6.0% of families and 12.2% of the population were below the poverty line, including 13.6% of those under age 18 and 16.3% of those age 65 or over.

Industry
Parkers Prairie has a number of different primary and secondary industries, from machine parts manufacture to arable produce processing. The high-tech medical device company AbbeyMoor Medical has its head office and manufacturing plant in Parkers Prairie. AbbeyMoor Medical manufactures The Spanner, a prostatic stent.

Notable people
 Duane Hanson – sculptor
 Donald M. Hultstrand – Bishop of Springfield
 Hugo Magnuson – grocer

References

External links
 Official site

Cities in Minnesota
Cities in Otter Tail County, Minnesota